The following are the national records in track cycling in Sweden, maintained by its national cycling federation, Swedish Cycling Federation (SCF, in Swedish: Svenska Cykelförbundet).

Men

Women

References

External links
SCF official website

Sweden
Records
Track cycling
track cycling